The 1980 San Francisco Giants season was the Giants' 98th season in Major League Baseball, their 23rd season in San Francisco since their move from New York following the 1957 season, and their 21st at Candlestick Park. The team finished in fifth place in the National League West with a 75–86 record, 17 games behind the Houston Astros.

Offseason 
 December 3, 1979: Guy Sularz was drafted by the Minnesota Twins from the San Francisco Giants in the 1979 rule 5 draft.
 December 19, 1979: Rob Andrews was released by the Giants.
 March 13, 1980: Rudy Meoli was signed as a free agent by the Giants.
 March 15, 1980: Joe Pettini was sent by the Montreal Expos to the San Francisco Giants to complete an earlier deal made on June 13, 1979.

Regular season

Season standings

Record vs. opponents

Opening Day lineup

Notable transactions 
 April 1, 1980: Guy Sularz was returned (earlier draft pick) by the Minnesota Twins to the San Francisco Giants.
 April 2, 1980: Jeff Little was released by the Giants.
 April 3, 1980: Pedro Borbón was released by the Giants.
 April 3, 1980: Rudy Meoli was released by the Giants.
 June 3, 1980: Jessie Reid was drafted by the San Francisco Giants in the 1st round (7th pick) of the 1980 amateur draft.
 June 3, 1980: Randy Gomez was drafted by the Giants in the 25th round of the 1980 Major League Baseball draft.
 June 16, 1980: Casey Parsons was purchased from the Giants by the Seattle Mariners.

Major League debuts
Batters: 
Chris Bourjos (Aug 31) 
 Rich Murray (Jun 7)  
Joe Pettini (Jul 10)  
Guy Sularz (Sep 2)  
Pitchers: 
Bill Bordley (Jun 30)  
Fred Breining (Sep 4) 
 Al Hargesheimer (Jul 14)  
Mike Rowland (Jul 25)  
Jeff Stember (Aug 5)

Roster

Player stats

Batting

Starters by position 
Note: Pos = Position; G = Games played; AB = At bats; H = Hits; Avg. = Batting average; HR = Home runs; RBI = Runs batted in

Other batters 
Note: G = Games played; AB = At bats; H = Hits; Avg. = Batting average; HR = Home runs; RBI = Runs batted in

Pitching

Starting pitchers 
Note: G = Games pitched; IP = Innings pitched; W = Wins; L = Losses; ERA = Earned run average; SO = Strikeouts

Other pitchers 
Note: G = Games pitched; IP = Innings pitched; W = Wins; L = Losses; ERA = Earned run average; SO = Strikeouts

Relief pitchers 
Note: G = Games pitched; W = Wins; L = Losses; SV = Saves; ERA = Earned run average; SO = Strikeouts

Awards and honors 
 Jack Clark RF, Willie Mac Award
All-Star Game

Farm system

References

External links
 1980 San Francisco Giants at Baseball Reference
 1980 San Francisco Giants at Baseball Almanac

San Francisco Giants seasons
San Francisco Giants season
1980 in San Francisco
San